Andrew Culver may refer to:
Andrew Culver (composer) (born 1953), American composer
Andrew Culver (railroad) (1832–1906), president of the Prospect Park and Coney Island Railroad (Culver Line)